Dark Flower was the pop duo of Melanie Williams and Joe Roberts, which was founded in 2001. Williams and Roberts had previously had hits independently in the UK Singles Chart. Dark Flower later became Bodhi.

References

External links
 Dark Flower discography at Discogs

English pop music duos